Triple parentheses or triple brackets, also known as an (((echo))), are an antisemitic symbol that has been used to highlight the names of individuals assumed to be of a Jewish background, or organizations thought to be owned by Jews. The practice originated from the alt-right-affiliated, neo-Nazi blog The Right Stuff; the blog's editors have explained that the symbol is meant to symbolize that the historic actions of Jews caused their surnames to "echo throughout history". The triple parentheses have been adopted as an online stigma by antisemites, neo-Nazis, browsers of the "Politically Incorrect" board on 4chan, and white nationalists to identify individuals of Jewish background as targets for online harassment, such as Jewish political journalists critical of Donald Trump during his 2016 election campaign.

Use of the notation was brought to mainstream attention by an article posted by Mic in June 2016. The reports also led Google to remove a browser extension meant to automatically place the "echo" notation around Jewish names on web pages, and the notation being classified as a form of hate speech by the Anti-Defamation League. In the wake of these actions, some users, both Jews and non-Jews, have intentionally placed their own names within triple parentheses as an act of reappropriation or solidarity.

Prior to its use as an antisemitic label or identifier, ((( screen name ))) had been used in online communities such as AOL to indicate that a user was "cyberhugging" the user with the specified screen name.

Use

The use of the "echo" originated from a 2014 episode of The Daily Shoah, a podcast produced by the alt-right, antisemitic, white nationalist blog The Right Stuff. The podcast includes a segment known as the "Merchant Minute", where Jewish names are spoken with a cartoonish echo effect to single them out. The editors of The Right Stuff explained that the use of an echo, represented in text using triple parentheses, was an internal meme meant to symbolize an opinion that the actions of Jews in the past cause their names to "echo throughout history". From the inside out, each parenthesis represents perceived Jewish involvement in mass media, mass immigration, and global Zionism.

The triple parentheses have since been used on social networking services such as Twitter by antisemites, alt-righters, neo-Nazis, and white nationalists as a signal to target Jews for harassment. A number of Jewish journalists told the website Mic that after their names were mentioned in echoes, they began to receive messages from trolls containing antisemitic messages, Holocaust photos, and death threats. The Jerusalem Post reported that the triple parentheses had "emerged as a weapon in the arsenal of the so-called 'alt-right', an amorphous, primarily online conservative movement that has been becoming more visible and vocal in the midst of Donald Trump's presidential campaign", and that these tactics were increasingly being used to target Jewish journalists posting content that was critical of the Republican Party candidate. A user who engages in these "dog-piling" actions described the echo notation as being like a "dog whistle". Search engines typically ignore punctuation contained in a query, meaning that it can be difficult to intentionally locate posts containing this notation.

In a June 2016 article detailing the phenomenon, Mic also reported that an extension had been developed for the Google Chrome web browser known as "Coincidence Detector", which automatically places the triple parentheses around the names of individuals who "[have] been involved in certain political movements and media empires". The extension contains a list of 8,771 names, including common Jewish names and surnames, those of media personalities who have been critical of Trump, Trump's son-in-law Jared Kushner, as well as organizations such as Ben & Jerry's and Kars4Kids.

The absurdist Twitter user dril sparked controversy in June 2016 after posting a tweet in which he made satirical use of the triple parentheses. Specifically, dril tweeted: "i refuse to consume any product that has been created by, or is claimed to have been created by, the (((Keebler Elves)))". Journalist Jay Hathaway wrote that most of dril's followers understood the tweet to be an ironic joke exploring the uncertain "etiquette around this very 2016 expression of bigotry ... Can a non-Jew apply the (((echoes))) to his own name as a show of allyship? Is it OK to use the parentheses in a joke at the white supremacists' expense? There's no clear consensus." Regardless, some far-right users of Twitter saw the tweet as a genuine signal of support for antisemitism, and others found the tweet to be in poor taste even as a joke.

Historical parallels
During the Stalinist purges, Jews who were accused of being "rootless cosmopolitans" had their names placed in single parentheses. It is unknown if the modern triple-parentheses practice is derived from the Soviet one or not. However, the epithet "rootless cosmopolitans" has recently been revived in a right-wing populist context in the United States, allegedly as a euphemism for Jews.

Response
On June 3, 2016, following the publishing of the Mic article, Google pulled the Coincidence Detector extension from the Chrome Web Store, citing a violation of its policies prohibiting "promotions of hate or incitement of violence". It had been downloaded around 2,500 times before its removal. In the wake of Google's removal of the extension, some Twitter users, including Jews and non-Jews, intentionally put triple parentheses around their usernames in an act of reappropriation or solidarity. White nationalists, in turn, put inverted echo parentheses—like )))this(((—around their usernames to indicate their non-Jewish heritage. Author Jeffrey Goldberg from The Atlantic said that he hoped that Jews could reclaim the symbolism in the same way as some LGBT people had reclaimed the word "queer". Jonathan Weisman, an editor at The New York Times, included the triple parentheses in the title of his 2018 book release, (((Semitism))): Being Jewish in America in the Age of Trump.

On June 6, 2016, the Anti-Defamation League (ADL) announced that it had placed the triple parentheses in its database of symbols that it considers hate speech. CEO Jonathan Greenblatt explained that the symbol was "the online equivalent of tagging a building with anti-Semitic graffiti or taunting someone verbally", and that the ADL was "working with our partners in the tech industry to investigate this phenomenon more deeply".

See also

References

Alt-right
Antisemitism in the United States
Hate speech
Internet memes
Punctuation
Symbolism
Symbols introduced in 2014
Neo-Nazi concepts
2014 introductions